PAPB may refer to:

 Polyaminopropyl biguanide, a preservative used in cleaning solutions for contact lenses
 St. George Airport (Alaska) (ICAO location indicator: PAPB), in St. George, Alaska, United States